Vladimir Romashkov was director of the first Russian narrative film, Stenka Razin, released on October 15 (October 28), 1908.

References

Film directors from the Russian Empire
Year of birth missing
Year of death missing